Kingdom Business is an American musical drama series created and executive produced by John J. Sakmar & Kerry Lenhart. It premiered on BET+ on May 19, 2022. In February 2023, the series was renewed for a second season.

Plot
The show follows Denita (Yolanda Adams), a gospel superstar who runs the in-house record label Kingdom Records and doubles as First Lady of First Kingdom Church. She also happens to be determined to guard her family and its many secrets at all costs. Just as Denita is enjoying the fruits of her labor, the world she’s worked so hard to put together begins to unravel when an unexpected contender in the gospel music scene threatens her status. Rbel (Serayah) is a young woman on the rise whose checkered past as an exotic dancer is no match for her destiny to turn the gospel world on its head with her newfound voice.

Cast and characters

Main
Yolanda Adams as Denita Jordan
Serayah as Rebecca "Rbel" Belle
Michael Jai White as Julius "Caesar" Jones
Michael Beach as Calvin Jordan
Chaundre A. Hall-Broomfield as Taj Jordan

Recurring
Dominique Johnson as Malcolm Walker
Tamar Braxton as Sasha
La'Myia Good as Essence
Aspen Kennedy as Zyan
Kiandra Richardson as C.J. Jordan-Walker
Kajuana S. Marie as Dani
Sam Malone as Dex
Louis Gossett Jr. as Bishop Jeremiah West
Patrice Fisher as Detective Juanita Parker

Episodes

Production

Development
On December 2, 2019, the series was in development by NBC. On August 23, 2021, the series was moved to BET+ where it received a series order. The series premiered on May 19, 2022. On February 2, 2023, BET+ renewed the series for a second season.

Casting
The main cast was revealed on December 7, 2021.

References

External links

2020s American black television series
2020s American drama television series
2022 American television series debuts
American musical television series
BET+ original programming
English-language television shows